Germany's Next Topmodel Cycle 1 is the first season of Germany's Next Topmodel (often abbreviated to GNTM) that aired on German television network ProSieben. The show started airing on 25 January 2006 with twelve girls in the competition. 18-year-old Lena Gercke came off as this season's winner. She became a successful model after the show and the host of Austria's Next Topmodel. IMG Models manages the winner and also managed first runner-up and second runner-up for one year.

The first season copied many photo shoot ideas from America's Next Top Model, especially from the first season. It has also gone with almost three episodes with a double-elimination for the models. The show was hosted by top model Heidi Klum. The international destinations for this cycle were New York City, Los Angeles and Paris.

Episode summaries

Episode 1: Der Sprung ins kalte Wasser
Original airdate: 

From over 11,000 applicants, 32 girls were selected to enter the competition. For their first challenge, the girls had to put together an outfit from the clothes they had packed for a meeting with the judges. After the challenge, twelve girls were eliminated, leaving twenty to compete for the twelve places in the finals.

 Eliminated: Alexandra B., Franziska, Isa, Julia-Theresa, Katrin, Martha, Missy, Monika, Myriel, Ramona, Sarah K. & Swetlana

For the next challenge, the 20 remaining models were taken by bus to the Zeche Walsum, a coal mine in Duisburg, where they had to walk down a runway for an audience of miners. After this, the twelve finalists were selected. Heidi then announced that they would be going to New York City.

 Eliminated: Alexandra F., Bettina, Britta, Dina, Irina, Karolina, Sarah L. & Sina

Episode 2: New York
Original airdate: 

Luise was anxious about flying to New York City, due to her fear of flying. After arriving, the girls had their first runway lesson with Bruce atop a skyscraper. The girls met up with Heidi at a rehearsal for a Victoria's Secret fashion show, where they met models such as Tyra Banks and Gisele Bündchen.

The first photo shoot took place on the rooftop of a skyscraper, where the girls were shot by Russell James in Victoria's Secret lingerie. For their first official challenge, the girls were given $100 each to buy an outfit to wear to the Victoria's Secret Show. Jennifer was chosen as the winner by Gisele Bündchen, and as her prize she got to watch the show. She chose Luise to share the prize.

At the first elimination, Andrea and Anne were sent home.

Eliminated: Andrea Lichtenberg & Anne Mühlmeier
Featured photographer: Russell James

Episode 3: Trau dich
Original airdate: 

The contestants returned to Germany. Since there were only eight beds available in their new house, the girls had to compromise.

The girls were taken to a hair salon to have makeovers. Lena G. had her hair cut short, while Janina refused to let her hair be cut the way the stylist proposed. Heidi's husband Seal visited the girls at the salon. Only Céline did not receive a makeover, as she left the competition for personal reasons.

Quit: Céline Roscheck

Back at the loft, the girls were given a runway lesson by Bruce, in which they had to balance a book on their heads while walking.

The theme of the photo shoot was iconic styles of the 1930s and 1940s. The girls were shot by Joachim Baldauf and posed with spiders and snakes.

At elimination, Rahel was eliminated after landing in the bottom two with Micaela.

Bottom two: Micaela Schäfer & Rahel Krüger
Eliminated: Rahel Krüger
Featured photographer: Joachim Baldauf

Episode 4: Zwischen den Welten
Original airdate:  

It was now down to Jennifer, Lena Meier, Luise, Lena G., Yvonne, Janina, Charlotte and Micaela. Their next challenge is to model at a subway station in Düsseldorf, where the girls have to do a runway walk on a waiting platform for the passengers waiting on their train. The girls are asked to put on an outfit without knowing where they are going. They are a little bit shocked but also excited when they find out what they have to do. Heidi watches them over the security cameras at the platform. She talks to them over the megaphone at the station. Afterwards all the girls are excited and say they loved this challenge. Her and Charlotte completed the task best and as a grand price they were invited to the "Night of the Proms" in Rotterdam by Heidi Klum's husband Seal, whom they also got to meet backstage. The other contestants spent the evening in the loft with food and gossip with Heidi Klum.

The next day professional press training waited for the candidates. However, the girls did not know it was a fake interview. They were filmed while talking to a reporter who told them that the interview would be featured in a magazine. The girls answered really private questions and even asked back what exactly the reporter was asking about their love life and sex life. Heidi later revealed to the girls that it was only a fake interview and showed the girls their biggest mistakes on tape and explained to them the rules to giving a good interview without revealing too much. They were all relieved that it was only training.

For the photo shoot, the girls had beauty shots taken. The contestants had to do different facial expressions such as great joy, laughter, anger or sadness. During elimination the girls were shown their photo with and without being altered and they were shocked to see how much actually had to be done to the photo in order to look good. Heidi told that it was important to take good care of their skin and to look their best always, because having to touch up photos after a shoot takes time and costs money and the less they have to change the better. Again, the girls had to go on the catwalk, this time wearing yellow jump suits and shoes that did not fit.

Micaela did not convince the judges and was eliminated for her lack of personality and her inability to convince in different modelling styles.

Eliminated: Micaela Schaefer
Featured photographer: Antoine Verglas

Episode 5: Und Bitte!
Original airdate: 

The contestants complete acting training with an acting coach. The girls act out a love/fight scene with renowned German actor Erol Sander. The challenge is to accuse him of cheating on them after they found a ring of another woman in his pocket. He then has to convince them it isn't true and they have to make up. Charlotte tried to kiss him in the end, which caused embarrassment in the group.

The next morning was the photo shoot. There was a bulletproof glass basin filled with 12.000 liters of water which weighs 30 tons, in which the girls have to pose underwater wearing evening gowns. For the models it is a genuine challenge. They have to be able to stop breathing for as long a time as possible, control their body movement, hands and feet. Luise felt unwell during the shoot. In the evening the girls had a karaoke party with Heidi.

Before she is called before the judges, Janina faces a difficult, personal decision: after she refused to cut her hair short (similar to Lena's style) during their make-over, she finally agrees to have her hair shortened the way the stylist recommended it. Once she sees the result however she is completely devastated and thinks she looks ugly. Once again right before the elimination the girls have to do a brief runway show for the judges. This time the challenge is to walk with raw eggs taped to their bare feet without breaking the eggs. This means the girls have to balance on their toes. Lena breaks her egg and slips on the runway. In the end however it is certain: Luise has to go - the judges don't think she is ready yet for the demanding life of a top model.

Eliminated: Luise Mikulla
Special guest: Erol Sander

Episode 6: Sexy Moves
Original airdate: 

The girls have dance training with Choreographer Georgia from London. They learn a dance sequence from a musical. They will need that dance for their upcoming photo shoot which is going to be a very sexy and rock-star style shoot. Yvonne cannot really follow the routine and cries. Surprise at the LOFT: the parents visit the girls amidst tears and laughter.

Later the girls have their first go-see at Escada, where chief designer Brian Rennie invites them to a casting for the Escada look book. The casting is only a test which the girls however do not know and Heidi pushes them to be absolutely pitch perfect with their walk and their presentation. She watches the casting from a nearby trailer. The purpose is to determine which one of the six girls would be able and ready to be cast by a world-famous fashion label and actually be considered for the job. The girls are asked to put on different Escada outfits and accessories and have to strike a pose as well as do a short runway walk for Brian Rennie. Lena G. simply looks amazing and very natural at the same time. Her and Janina are the best and may for one evening and one night go to Paris where they meet Peyman Amin from IMG models who takes them out clubbing.

While Lena and Janina are still travelling back to Germany from Paris the other girls are already on location for their photo shoot in a theater in Cologne. The girls get crazy hair, big make-up and some Musical Star/Rock Star style outfit. Their task is to use the moves they have learned from Georgia in order to deliver a really cool photo with a lot of movement and expression. Jennifer has a terrible stomach ache, but she does not let her bad health get in the way with her performance. She is very cool and convincing and the judges are amazed. Charlotte however is not doing so well with her shoot, she is too shy and cannot present herself in a sexy way. She clearly feels uncomfortable with the whole setting and the task. The judges criticise her badly. Lena G. and Janina are tired after only one hour of sleep, however they pull themselves together and after a short "warming up" they take good photos.

This week the elimination is especially hard on Bruce: Lena M. and Charlotte must go. Bruce is speechless and cries, because Lena M. was his favourite and he is heartbroken and cannot stop crying. After the dismissal Heidi joins the girls backstage and she tells them they are going to get a full body waxing for their next shoot - Body painting with Joanne Gair. The girls are excited.

Eliminated: Lena Meier & Charlotte Offeney
Special guest: Brian Rennie

Episode 7: Bodypainting
Original airdate: 

Swedish model Marcus Schenkenberg is arriving and makes the girls very nervous. He will assist the judges this week in evaluating the girls. They are taken to a nearby shopping mall. Yvonne has to announce a runway show to all the people at the mall using a megaphone. The other girls do not yet know what to expect. They are given wigs and big sunglasses and have a very tight schedule to do their runway. Four outfits for each of the four girls. They have one minute to change in a room and run back up the escalator to do their runway, otherwise the show is interrupted. Styling and accessories is completely up to the girls. Will they be able to complete such a hectic and stressful task? How do they react, if there are problems? This is exactly what the judges want to find out with this task. The girls are running around like crazy but the show goes well and later the girls take it easy during a game of Pool Billiard with Marcus.

The next morning body painting artist Joanne Gair arrives from New Zealand and wants to get to know the girls before the shoot in person. It becomes a difficult day for all of them. Joanne will paint and will photograph two girls per day. The body painting will be an animal print winding around the shoulders, legs, breasts and stomach with long hair extensions and a dark but warm background and lighting. For the body painting of one models she needs between six and seven hours. Lena has problems with the fact that she will be completely naked in front of the camera and asks for more time to consider this. She is aware of the importance of the photo shoot for the next decision, but at the same time she feels very uncomfortable being naked in front of other people and in a photo. She calls home and talks it through with her parents. Joanne shows the girls photos of her work from her book. She has done the famous cover of Vanity Fair with a pregnant Demi Moore and she did some amazing Body Painting shoots with Heidi for Sports Illustrated. The girls appreciate this and admire her work.

The body painting is in full course. Jennifer poses second and Joanne is very respectful and kind and creates an atmosphere so the girls forget they have nothing on except color on their body. Jennifer gets really cold and her feet and legs go numb. After the shoot she can barely stand up and walk, that's how bad her legs hurt. Bruce has to hold her so she can stand. Nobody noticed this during the shoot and Heidi is absolutely impressed and praises Jennifer for being so professional and not complaining at all. While Joanne is applying color to Yvonne's body, Lena arrives at the Studio. She took all night to make her decision and eventually agrees to do it. Heidi respects Lena for not taking her clothes off immediately, but thinking it through and making sure that she feels comfortable with the people on the set.

This week the judges find it extremely difficult to pick one girl to send home, because they all had a good week, but still they must decide, which of the four girls has the most and the least potential to become "Germany's Next Topmodel". After much consideration they decide not to eliminate any of the girls so all four are moving on to the next challenge.

Eliminated: None
Featured photographer: Joanne Gair
Special guest: Marcus Schenkenberg

Episode 8: Sunny California
Original airdate: 

After taking a vacation at home for one week the girls meet at Munich airport without knowing their destination. At the check-in counter they receive the new "Heidi-Mail" and she announces that the girls are flying to Los Angeles! After a 12 hours flight the girls arrive at California and are taken to their hotel. On the next morning they are waiting for their next challenged - slightly jet-lagged. When Heidi arrives she tells them that they are going to visit the star coiffeur Giuseppe Franco. But the girls are not there in order to get spoiled.

They have to address complete strangers in the street and persuade them to do a make-over. The four girls are given 30 minutes to do this and prove to Heidi and Armin that they have a feeling for make-up and hair styling. The girls are panicking and pick anyone of the street instead of choosing for a few minutes to see how could easily be styled. The results vary from very bad to acceptable and the winners are announced as Lena and Jennifer.

Next runway training takes place at the Santa Monica Pier, one of the most famous beach promenades in the world. Bruce taught the girls all the basics. Now he prepares them for different styles, which are required on the international runways depending on the outfits they are presenting. The girls are wearing extremely high heels and walking is difficult. Many onlookers take photos and many Americans state for the camera that the girls are more beautiful than the American contestants on the show and they would all make them topmodels.

On the next day: the main photo shoot, which will considerably influence the decision of the judges. At 6.30 the preparations start at famous Malibu Beach. The girls are photographed in a Bikini jumping on a trampolining. Again precision and body-control are essential. Heidi joins the fun and jumps on the trampoline, too. Funny and sexy pictures are the result!

The last task is a runway show in front of the judges: first up the sporty, natural look. Then sexy and elegant. With a lot of time pressure they must match their make-up to the outfit and express their style on the runway using one of the different walking techniques taught by Bruce.

Before the elimination the judges consider yet again everything they have seen from the girls so far including pictures and runway style. Minutes pass which will decide about the future of the girls. Eventually Janinas dream is ending. She worked very hard, but the jury is of the opinion that the other girls still have more potential. Janina takes it very hard and she talks badly about Jennifer who she feels does not even want to be a model and she would have deserved to stay on the show instead of her.

Eliminated: Janina Ortmann
Featured photographer: Arthur Elgort
Special guest: Giuseppe Franco

Episode 9: Paris wir kommen!
Original airdate: 

A double examination is approaching for the girls. They must convince the Casting Director AND prove Heidi thereby that they would be as top models able, to slip before the camera into a strange role. Jennifer makes itself thereby at the best one. Hard days in LA: Lena, Jennifer and Yvonne must fight against their tiredness. The show for the Jeans label YMI in club Basque Hollywood is an important test. In the small framework the girls are to get accustomed to it for a designer before public to run. Top model candidate inside must shine with the show in the club, otherwise they go down on really important gangways.

The test in the club was a full success. But on the next morning Heidi organized already again a date. It is on the way to Christian Audigier, the designer of the Street ware label Ed Hardy. The cool Look is particularly announced with Hollywood of star extremely. With the Ed Hardy shoot is responsible the girls for everything. Now they can show whether they watched out with Amin well.
LA has to offer much. But the largest attraction for the girls was it not to think for a few hours of its achievements and have with Heidi fun. To the daily strolls it ended together over the Santa Monica jetty.

Still do not know Lena, Jennifer and Yvonne that morning will become a completely special day for it: at 7 o'clock of morning starts the photo shoot with the chief talking document urine of the German Cosmopolitan, Petra Gessulat and star photographer Pavel Havlicek.

While Heidi remains because of dates in LA, the girls travel to Paris. Here it expects its largest challenge. The small show in the club in LA, training with Bruce - everything served the preparation on a completely special moment! John Ribbe, an internationally successful designer invites the girls to the casting. There the girls will compete for the first time with professional Models.
All girls have their strengths, in addition, their weaknesses. And only one of them can become Germany's Next Topmodel. This time however each still continued to come. This week there is no panel.

Booked for job: Jennifer Wanderer,  Lena Gercke & Yvonne Schröder (Paris fashion week)
Eliminated: None
Featured photographer: Pavel Havlicek
Special guest: Petra Gessulat & John Ribbe

Episode 10: Das Finale
Original airdate: 

In the final, Jennifer is eliminated first due to her performance on the casting for Paris Fashion Week. This leaves Lena and Yvonne. In the end Lena is declared the winner. She eventually went on to become a successful model and the host of Austria's Next Topmodel.

Final three: Jennifer Wanderer, Lena Gercke & Yvonne Schröder
Eliminated: Jennifer Wanderer
Final two: Yvonne Schröder & Lena Gercke
Germany's Next Topmodel: Lena Gercke
Featured photographer: Pavel Havlicek
Special guest: Petra Gessulat & John Ribbe

Contestants

(ages stated are at start of contest)

Summaries

Results table

 The contestant was in danger of elimination
 The contestant was eliminated
 The contestant withdrew from the competition
 The contestant won the competition

Photo shoot guide
 Episode 2 photo shoot: Lingerie
 Episode 3 photo shoot: Wildlife
 Episode 4 photo shoot: Natural Beauty
 Episode 5 photo shoot: Underwater
 Episode 6 photo shoot: Musical
 Episode 7 photo shoot: Body Painting
 Episode 8 photo shoot: Trampoline
 Episode 9 photo shoot: Cosmopolitan
 Episode 10 photo shoot: Emotions

References

External links 
 

Germany's Next Topmodel
2006 German television seasons
Television shows filmed in Germany
Television shows filmed in Los Angeles
Television shows filmed in New York City
Television shows filmed in France